A hospital ship is a ship designated for primary function as a floating medical treatment facility or hospital. Most are operated by the military forces (mostly navies) of various countries, as they are intended to be used in or near war zones. In the 19th century, redundant warships were used as moored hospitals for seamen.

The Second Geneva Convention prohibits military attacks on hospital ships that meet specified requirements, though belligerent forces have right of inspection and may take  patients, but not staff, as prisoners of war.

History

Early examples

Hospital ships possibly existed in ancient times. The Athenian Navy had a ship named Therapia, and the Roman Navy had a ship named Aesculapius, their names indicating that they may have been hospital ships.

The earliest British hospital ship may have been the vessel Goodwill, which accompanied a Royal Navy squadron in the Mediterranean in 1608 and was used to house the sick sent aboard from other ships. However this experiment in medical care was short-lived, with Goodwill assigned to other tasks within a year and her complement of convalescents simply left behind at the nearest port. It was not until the mid-seventeenth century that any Royal Navy vessels were formally designated as hospital ships, and then only two throughout the fleet. These were either hired merchant ships or elderly sixth rates, with the internal bulkheads removed to create more room, and additional ports cut through the deck and hull to increase internal ventilation.

In addition to their sailing crew, these seventeenth century hospital ships were staffed by a surgeon and four surgeon's mates. The standard issue of medical supplies was bandages, soap, needles and bedpans. Patients were offered a bed or rug to rest upon, and given a clean pair of sheets. These early hospital ships were for the care of the sick rather than the wounded, with patients quartered according to their symptoms and infectious cases quarantined from the general population behind a sheet of canvas. The quality of food was very poor. In the 1690s the surgeon aboard Siam complained that the meat was in an advanced state of putrefaction, the biscuits were weevil-ridden and bitter, and the bread was so hard that it stripped the skin off patients’ mouths.

Hospital ships were also used for the treatment of wounded soldiers fighting on land. An early example of this was during an English operation to evacuate English Tangier in 1683. An account of this evacuation was written by Samuel Pepys, an eyewitness. One of the main concerns was the evacuation of sick soldiers "and the many families and their effects to be brought off". The hospital ships Unity and Welcome sailed for England on 18 October 1683 with 114 invalid soldiers and 104 women and children, arriving at The Downs on 14 December 1683.

The number of medical personnel aboard Royal Navy hospital ships was slowly increased, with regulations issued in 1703 requiring that each vessel also carry six landsmen to act as surgical assistants, and four washerwomen. A 1705 amendment provided for a further five male nurses, and requisitions from the era suggest the number of sheets per patient was increased from one to two pairs. On 8 December 1798, unfit for service as a warship,  was ordered to be converted to a hospital ship to hold wounded French and Spanish prisoners of war. According to Edward Hasted in 1798, two large hospital ships (also called lazarettos), (which were the surviving hulks of forty-four gun ships) were moored in Halstow Creek in Kent. The creek is an inlet from the River Medway and the River Thames. The crew of these vessels watched over ships coming to England, which were forced to stay in the creek under quarantine to protect the country from infectious diseases including the plague.

From 1821 to 1870 the Seamen's Hospital Society provided HMS Grampus, HMS Dreadnought and HMS Caledonia (later renamed Dreadnought) as successive hospital ships moored at Deptford in London. In 1866 HMS Hamadryad was moored in Cardiff as a seamen's hospital, replaced in 1905 by the Royal Hamadryad Seamen's Hospital. Other redundant warships were used as hospitals for convicts and prisoners of war.

Modern hospital ships

The Royal Navy institutionalised the use of hospital ships during the first half of the nineteenth century. Hospital ships were generally superior in their standard of service and sanitation to the medical provision available at the time for convalescent soldiers. The modern hospital ship began to emerge during the Crimean War in the 1850s. The only military hospital available to the British forces fighting on the Crimean Peninsula was at Scutari near the Bosphorus. During the Siege of Sevastopol almost 15,000 wounded troops were transported there from the port at Balaklava by a squadron of converted hospital ships.

The first ships to be equipped with genuine medical facilities were the steamships HMS Melbourne and HMS Mauritius, staffed by the Medical Staff Corps and providing services to the British expedition to China in 1860. The ships provided relatively spacious accommodation for the patients, and were equipped with an operating theatre.

During the Russo-Turkish War (1877–78), the British Red Cross supplied a steel-hulled ship, equipped with modern surgery equipment including chloroform and other anaesthetics, and carbolic acid for antisepsis. Similar vessels accompanied the 1882 British invasion of Egypt and aided American personnel during the 1898 Spanish–American War.

Hospital ships were used by both sides in the Russo-Japanese War of 1904–1905. The sighting by the Japanese of the Russian hospital ship Orel, illuminated in accordance with regulations for hospital ships, led to the decisive naval Battle of Tsushima. Orel was retained as a prize of war by the Japanese after the battle.

World Wars

During World War I and World War II, hospital ships were first used on a massive scale. By the end of the First World War, the British Royal Navy had 77 such ships in service. During the Gallipoli Campaign, hospital ships were used to evacuate over 100,000 wounded personnel to Egypt.

Canada operated hospital ships in both world wars. In World War II, Canada operated the hospital ship  and [[SS Letitia|SS Letitia (II)]].

During World War II both the United States Navy and Army operated hospital ships though with different purposes. Naval hospital ships were fully equipped hospitals designed to receive casualties direct from the battlefield and also supplied to provide logistical support to front line medical teams ashore. Army hospital ships were essentially hospital transports intended and equipped to evacuate patients from forward area Army hospitals to rear area hospitals or from those to the United States and were not equipped or staffed to handle large numbers of direct battle casualties.

The last British royal yacht, the post World War II , was constructed in a way as to be convertible to a hospital ship in wartime. After her decommissioning, Peter Hennessy discovered that her actual role would have been as Queen Elizabeth II's refuge from nuclear weapons, hiding amidst the lochs of western Scotland.

A development of the Lun-class ekranoplan was planned for use as a mobile field hospital for rapid deployment to any ocean or coastal location at a speed of 297 knots (550 km/h, 341.8 mph). Work was 90% complete on this model, Spasatel, but Soviet military funding ceased and it was never completed.

Mercy Ships is an international non-governmental charity (or NGO).

International law

Hospital ships were covered under the Hague Convention X of 1907. Articles of the Hague Convention X specified the provisions for a hospital ship:
 Hospital-ships must be painted white. Military hospital ships must have a green band; ships operated by approved relief societies and similar must have a red band
 Ships must fly a red cross flag in addition to their national flag
 The ship should give medical assistance to wounded personnel of all nationalities
 The ship must not be used for any military purpose, or interfere with or hamper enemy combatant vessels
 Belligerents, as designated by the Hague Convention, can search any hospital ship to investigate violations of the above restrictions
 Belligerents will establish the location of a hospital ship

According to the San Remo Manual on International Law Applicable to Armed Conflicts at Sea, a hospital ship violating legal restrictions must be duly warned and given a reasonable time limit to comply. If a hospital ship persists in violating restrictions, a belligerent is legally entitled to capture it or take other means to enforce compliance. A non-complying hospital ship may only be fired on under the following conditions:
 Diversion or capture is not feasible
 No other method to exercise control is available
 The violations are grave enough to allow the ship to be classified as a military objective
 The damage and casualties will not be disproportionate to the military advantage.

In all other circumstances, attacking a hospital ship is a war crime.

Modern hospital ships display large Red Crosses or Red Crescents to signify their Geneva Convention protection under the laws of war. Even so, marked vessels have not been completely free from attack.

 Current hospital ships 

While any ship can be designated and marked as a hospital ship, many ships are permanently dedicated to that function.

 Current military hospital ships 

 Current non-military hospital ships 

Other shipborne hospitals
It is common for naval ships, especially large ships such as aircraft carriers and amphibious assault ships to have on-board hospitals. However, they are only one small part of the vessel's overall capability, and are used primarily for the ship's crew and its amphibious forces (and occasionally for relief missions). A warship with hospital facilities does not have the protected status of a hospital ship.
A primary example of the varied military-based hospital services available at sea is found aboard several types of US naval ships;

 United States Navy;
  – USS Gerald R. Ford, first in the class, has an on-board hospital that includes a full lab, pharmacy, operating room, 3-bed intensive care unit, 2-bed emergency room, and 41-bed hospital ward, staffed by 11 medical officers and 30 hospital corpsmen.
  – Each carrier has a 53-bed hospital ward, a three-bed ICU, and acts as the hospital ship for the entire carrier strike group. In one year, the medical department of  handled over 15,000 out-patient visits, drew almost 27,000 labs, filled almost 10,000 prescriptions, took about 2,300 x-rays and performed 65 surgical operations. There is not much variation among the ships of the class. The first ship,  has 53 beds, plus 3 ICU beds, and the last ship,  has 51 beds, plus 3 ICU beds.

  (LHD) – These ships have 6 operating rooms, 14 ICU beds, 46 hospital beds, 4 battle dressing stations, medical imaging (i.e.:X-ray), a fully functional laboratory, and a blood bank. The ship can expand its medical complement to 600 beds, making it the second largest hospital at sea, second only to actual hospital ships.
  amphibious assault ship (LHA) – This is the newest and largest class both in the USN and the world. The on-board hospitals of these first two vessels will have 2 operating rooms and 24 beds. It is unknown if this design change will affect the expanded capability for additional beds, nor what size the medical facilities of future ships of the class will be.
  (LPD) – 24 hospital beds.
  (LSD) – 11 hospital beds.
  (LSD) – 8 hospital beds.

More examples from various other national navies include;
 Argentine Navy
  – Icebreaker which can be deployed as a hospital ship.

 Royal Australian Navy
  – This class is based on the Juan Carlos I-class design, and has 2 operating rooms and a hospital ward.

 People's Liberation Army Navy
 Several armed s are fitted out as "ambulance transports".
 Shichang – a multi-role training ship built in 1997. Deck space can accommodate modular medical units and can be used as a medical treatment facility, but the primary role is aviation training. The layout is very similar to RFA Argus'' (see above).

 French Navy
  – On board hospital is NATO Echelon level-3, with 69 hospital beds, 7 ICU beds, and an additional 50 beds if needed. The ship also has medical imaging capabilities, such as X-ray, CT-scan and ultrasound.

 Italian Navy
  aircraft carrier – Has an on-board hospital with 2 operating rooms, 1 intensive care unit, laboratory, pharmacy and a 32-bed hospital ward.
  logistic ship – On-board hospital is NATO ROLE-level 2+, with operating room, intensive care unit and a laboratory.

 Japan Maritime Self-Defense Force
  – These ships have 2 operating rooms, 2 ICU beds, 35 hospital beds, 1 battle dressing station and several medical imaging (i.e.:X-ray) stations.
  – These ships have 1 operating room, 1 ICU bed, 8 hospital beds.
  - These ships have 1 operating room, 2 ICU beds, 6 hospital beds.

 Spanish Navy
  – Has a 40-bed hospital on board.

 Royal Navy
 Royal Fleet Auxiliary ship  – This ship would be a hospital ship were it not for its armaments. However, it is instead designated as a 'Primary Casualty Receiving Ship' (PCRS).

See also
Lists
 List of hospital ships sunk in World War I
 List of hospital ships sunk in World War II
 List of hospital ships of the Australian Navy
 List of hospital ships of the Brazilian Navy
 List of hospital ships of the Chinese Navy
 List of hospital ships of the Royal Navy
 List of hospital ships of the United States Navy
 List of hospital ships of the United States Army
 List of hospital ships of the United States Sanitary Commission

Others
 Mercy Ships
 Hospital train
 Hague Convention on Hospital Ships
 Hospital ships designated for the COVID-19 pandemic	
 Women on Waves

References

External links
 Australian War Memorial – Sinking of the Centaur 
 WW2 US Hospital Ships
 US Army Hospital Ships in WWII
 New Zealand Hospital Ships (chapter of official history of WWI)

Ship types
 
Military medical installations
Types of health care facilities